The Historical PZL P.11c is an American homebuilt aircraft that was designed and produced by Historical Aircraft Corporation of Nucla, Colorado. The aircraft is a 66% scale replica of the Polish PZL P.11c fighter and when it was available was supplied as a kit for amateur construction.

Design and development
The aircraft features a strut-braced high-wing, a single-seat open cockpit with a windshield, fixed conventional landing gear and a single engine in tractor configuration.

The aircraft is made from welded steel tubing and wood, with its flying surfaces covered in doped aircraft fabric. The standard engine used is the  CAM 100 four stroke powerplant.

The kit included prefabricated assemblies, the engine and scale fixed pitch propeller, basic VFR instruments, fabric and even paint. Also included were replica 7.9 mm machine guns and a ring gun site. The manufacturer indicated that the design was intended for novice builders and estimated the construction time from the supplied kit as 1400 hours.

Specifications (PZL P.11c)

References

PZL P.11c
1990s United States sport aircraft
Single-engined tractor aircraft
High-wing aircraft
Homebuilt aircraft
Replica aircraft